Vormsi Parish is a rural municipality of Estonia, in Lääne County. It covers the area of Vormsi island. The population of Vormsi is 231 (as of 1 January 2013) and has an area of 92.93 km2.

Settlements
There are 14 villages in Vormsi Parish: Borrby, Diby, Fällarna, Förby, Hosby, Hullo, Kersleti, Norrby, Rumpo, Rälby, Saxby, Sviby, Suuremõisa and Söderby.

Religion

History
The island of Vormsi rose from the sea at around 1000 B.C. Before World War II, Vormsi (Ormsö in Swedish) was mainly inhabited by Coastal Swedes, who formed the majority of the island's population of ~3000 people. Most of the Swedes moved to Sweden before the Soviet Occupation of Estonia. After the independence of Estonia in 1992, Swedish families have started to return to the island and rebuild their former estates. Most of the Swedes visit the island during the summer season.

Economy
Per capita income of Vormsi Parish is the third biggest in Estonia.

References

External links